Louis Morales may refer to:

Louis de Morales (died 1586), Spanish painter
Louis Morales, see List of The Walking Dead (TV series) characters